Dream Girl 2 is an upcoming Indian Hindi-language comedy drama film directed by Raaj Shaandilyaa. It stars Ayushmann Khurrana and Ananya Pandey in lead roles. It is scheduled to be released on 7 July 2023. It is the spiritual sequel of the 2019 film  Dream Girl.

Cast 
Ayushmann Khurrana as Karamveer Singh /Pooja
Ananya Pandey as Pari
Paresh Rawal as Anna Seth   
Rajpal Yadav
Manoj Joshi
Asrani
Annu Kapoor
Seema Pahwa
Manjot Singh
Abhishek Bannerjee

References

External links
 

2020s Hindi-language films
2023 comedy films
2023 films
Films directed by Raaj Shaandilyaa
Balaji Motion Pictures films
Cross-dressing in Indian films